Mark McMahon is a Scottish born indoor and lawn bowls player, who has represented England, Hong Kong and Australia at international level.

Bowls

Outdoors
He has had a nomadic career being born in Scotland but representing Hong Kong until 1995 and then England and Australia at international level. He represented Hong Kong at three Commonwealth Games in 1986, 1990 and 1994 with his greatest achievement being a silver medal in the singles at the 1990 Commonwealth Games in Auckland, New Zealand.

He won five medals at the Asia Pacific Bowls Championships representing Hong Kong, they were four silver medals and one bronze medal from 1989 to 1993. In 1988, he won the Hong Kong International Bowls Classic pairs title.

Indoors
He has competed at the World indoor Championships since 1989 and has reached a career best seeding of three and we won the 2001 World Indoor Bowls Championship pairs title in Great Yarmouth with bowls partner Les Gillett.

Family
Both of his parents Bill McMahon and Rosemary McMahon were international bowlers.

References

Living people
English male bowls players
Hong Kong male bowls players
Scottish male bowls players
Australian male bowls players
Indoor Bowls World Champions
1970 births
Commonwealth Games medallists in lawn bowls
Commonwealth Games silver medallists for Hong Kong
Bowls players at the 1990 Commonwealth Games
Medallists at the 1990 Commonwealth Games